Jory Michael Collins (born October 14, 1978) is an American women's college basketball coach currently serving as the head coach for the North Dakota State program. From 2010 until 2018, Collins was the head coach at Emporia State University. Collins led the Emporia State Lady Hornets to eight consecutive winning seasons.

Coaching career 
In April 2010, Jory Collins was selected as the head basketball coach of the Emporia State women's basketball program following the resignation of then-head coach, Brandon Schneider, who had announced that he had accepted the position at Stephen F. Austin. Previously, Collins served as the assistant for Emporia State. Before becoming a full-time assistant for the team, he held several positions with the team including a Student Assistant and Volunteer Coach. In the 2004–05 season, he was a Graduate Assistant and in 2006, he was promoted to a full-time assistant.

Emporia State University (2010–2018) 
During his eight seasons at helm of the Lady Hornets program, Collins won five consecutive MIAA tournaments from 2013 to 2017 and finished with combined a record of 199–58 overall and a 123–44 record in the MIAA. He is the first coach in Emporia State history to advance to six conference tournament championships and four regional championships in five years.

2010–11 season 
In his first season, Collins led the Lady Hornets to a 20–9 overall, and 15–7 conference winning season. He led them to the MIAA Tournament title game, which they lost to the Northwest Missouri Bearcats.

2011–12 season 
The following season, Collins led the Lady Hornets to a 23–9 overall, and 14–6 conference winning season. With that, the Lady Hornets advanced to their second consecutive MIAA Tournament title game, in which they lost. They also advanced on to the NCAA Sweet 16 where they lost to the Pittsburg State Gorillas.

2012–13 season 
In 2012–13, the Lady Hornets were preseason ranked 19 in the WBCA poll. During the 2012–13 season, Collins lead the Lady Hornets went on to an overall record of 23–9, and 13–5 conference winning season. The Lady Hornets went on to their third consecutive MIAA tournament title game, in which they won against the University of Central Missouri Jennies 67–51. This was their fifth tournament win, and first since the tournament moved to Kansas City, Missouri in 2003. They again made it to the NCAA Sweet 16, where they lost to the Augustana Vikings 75–74.

2013–14 season 

In 2013–14, the Lady Hornets were preseason ranked 9 in the Women's Division II Bulletin Preseason Top 10 Rankings poll. During the 2013–14 season, Collins lead the Lady Hornets went on to an overall record of 30–4, and 16–3 conference winning season. For the fourth consecutive season, Collins coached the Lady Hornets to their fourth MIAA tournament title game, in which they won against the Central Missouri Jennies. The Lady Hornets went to the NCAA Regionals, in which they lost to the Concordia–St. Paul Golden Bears 70–67. At the end of the season in March 2014, Collins was selected as the NCAA Division II Region 7 Russell Athletic/WBCA Coach of the Year.

2014–15 season 
In 2014–15, the Lady Hornets were preseason ranked 7th in the Women's Division II Bulletin Preseason Top 10 Rankings poll. During the 2014–15 season, Collins lead the Lady Hornets to an overall record of 29–5, and 15–4 conference winning season. For the fifth consecutive season, Collins coached the Lady Hornets to their fifth MIAA tournament title game, in which they won their third-straight against the Fort Hays State Tigers 49–46. The Lady Hornets went to the NCAA Regionals, in which they again beat Fort Hays State in the Finals to advance to the Elite Eight. Collins then led the team to the Final Four, where they lost to the California Vulcans. In post-season honors, Collins won the Kansas Basketball Coaches Association "Coach of the Year".

2015–16 season 
Entering into the 2015–16 season, the Lady Hornets were chosen as the national favorite in both the D-II Bulletin Preseason National Poll and the Women's Basketball Coaches Association, as well as the MIAA polls. The first loss of the season came in December against Fort Hays State, where the Tigers defeated Emporia State 71–70. The Lady Hornets would then go on to lose four more times by 15 or less points. The Lady Hornets ended the regular season 23–5 (17–5 in conference play)finishing in fourth place in the MIAA standings. The Lady Hornets competed in the MIAA Conference Tournament in Kansas City, Kansas, where they won their fourth straight Conference Tournament Championship. The Lady Hornets ended the postseason in their fifth straight Sweet 16, losing to conference rival Pittsburg State, and finished with an overall record of 28–6.

2016–17 season 
After winning their fourth straight Conference Tournament Championship, the Lady Hornets entered the 2016–17 season ranked fourth in the nation. and the favorite to win in the MIAA. As was the case in the previous season, the Lady Hornets' first loss of the season came in December to Fort Hays State where the Tigers defeated the Lady Hornets by three points. The Lady Hornets would go on to finish out the regular season losing only three more times and winning most games by 10 or more points, finishing the regular season 24–4 overall, 15–4 in conference play tying for second place in the MIAA. The Lady Hornets won their fifth straight MIAA Conference Tournament Championship, and finished the postseason losing the Sweet 16 to Harding.

2017–18 season 
The 2017–18 season brought some challenges to the Lady Hornets basketball team. Two of the team's seniors were out with knee and ankle injuries that occurred prior to the season. Collins led the Lady Hornets to an overall record of 17–11, and 11–8 conference record, ending a five-consecutive MIAA Tournament championship streak and marking the first time the Lady Hornets did not make the NCAA postseason since 2011.

North Dakota State (2019–present) 
On April 29, 2019, Collins was named the next head coach for the North Dakota State Bison women's basketball program after serving one year as a women's assistant basketball coach at the University of Kansas. He will take over a struggling NDSU program in which their last winning record season was the 2009–10 season.

Head coaching record

Personal
Collins and his wife, Casey, have two sons Jett and Jude. Collins competed in high school sports. He received his bachelor's of science from ESU in 2002 and his master's degree in 2006.

References

External links
 Emporia State Lady Hornets bio
 Kansas Jayhawks bio

1978 births
Living people
American women's basketball coaches
Basketball coaches from Kansas
Emporia State Lady Hornets basketball coaches
Kansas Jayhawks women's basketball coaches
North Dakota State Bison women's basketball coaches
Emporia State University alumni
People from Holton, Kansas